Assumpta Ingabire is Rwandan female politician, serving as the  Minister of State, in Charge of Social Affairs in the Ministry of Local Government of Rwanda. Prior to her appointment, she had served consecutively as a Permanent secretary at the Ministry of Gender and Family Planning, and permanent Secretary at Ministry of Local Government of Rwanda

References 

Women government ministers of Rwanda
Living people
Government ministers of Rwanda
Family ministers of Rwanda
Social affairs ministers of Rwanda
Year of birth missing (living people)